Resource acquisition ability (RAA) is a term in social psychology and the sexual opposite of the reproductive value (RV), introducing an unintentional mechanism used by women when selecting a male partner. The RAA is focused on some factors:
 Genetic information
 Wealth
 Salary
 Social status
 Child care
 Personal history (i.e. crime affairs are not good for the RAA)
 Numerous other things

Unlike the reproduction value, the RAA is not a scale. Mainly because of the unindexable factors, this term is a bit more complex than the RV.

See also
 Hypergamy
 Interpersonal attraction

References
 Stewart, Stinnett and Rosenfeld. "Sex Differences in Desired Characteristics of Short-Term and Long-Term Relationship Partners"

Interpersonal attraction
Interpersonal relationships